Charles "Champ" Hough Jr. (born 3 May 1934) is an American equestrian and Olympic medallist. He won a bronze medal in eventing at the 1952 Summer Olympics in Helsinki. He was the youngest equestrian competitor at the games. He is the father of the American equestrian Lauren Hough.

References

External links

1934 births
Living people
American male equestrians
Olympic bronze medalists for the United States in equestrian
Equestrians at the 1952 Summer Olympics
Sportspeople from San Diego
Medalists at the 1952 Summer Olympics